Xinfu, formerly Xin County and then the county-level Xinzhou city, is the only district and the seat of the city of Xinzhou, Shanxi province, China.

Transportation
Xinzhou West railway station is located here.

References

External links
www.xzqh.org 

County-level divisions of Shanxi
Xinzhou